My Hero Academia is a Japanese manga series written and illustrated by Kōhei Horikoshi. The story is set in a world where most of the world population has superhuman abilities known as "Quirks". The protagonist Izuku Midoriya is a teenage boy who was born without a Quirk, despite his longtime dream to be a superhero, until he is approached by All Might, the most famous hero in Japan and the world and also his childhood idol, who chooses him to inherit his Quirk "One For All" and helps to enroll him in a prestigious high school for superheroes in training.

My Hero Academia began its serialization in the manga magazine Weekly Shōnen Jump on July 7, 2014. Its individual chapters have been collected into thirty-seven tankōbon volumes, the first volume released on November 4, 2014. The series is licensed for English-language release in North America by Viz Media, who published the first volume on August 4, 2015. As the series is published in Japan, it is also released simultaneously in English digitally by Viz Media's Weekly Shonen Jump and later its website. Additionally, the first twenty volumes within a box set of the series was published by Viz Media on October 18, 2022.

A spin-off series entitled My Hero Academia: Smash!! by Hirofumi Neda started in the Shōnen Jump+ digital app on November 9, 2015, and finished on November 6, 2017. Five tankōbon volumes have been released as of November 2017. In November 2018, during their panel at Anime NYC, Viz Media announced that they have licensed the manga. The first volume was released in North America on August 6, 2019. A second spin-off series, My Hero Academia: Vigilantes, began being published biweekly on the Shōnen Jump+ website and app in 2017. The series finalized on May 28, 2022. The series is licensed for the English-language release in North America by Viz Media, who published the first volume on July 3, 2018. A third spin-off series, My Hero Academia: Team-Up Missions by Yōkō Akiyama, began serialization in Saikyō Jump on August 2, 2019, with a prologue chapter debuting in Jump GIGA on July 25, 2019. The series is also licensed for the English-language release in North America by Viz Media. The first volume was released in North America on March 2, 2021.



Main series

Volume list

Chapters not yet in tankōbon format
These chapters have yet to be published in a tankōbon volume. They were originally serialized in Japanese in issues of Weekly Shōnen Jump from December 2022 to March 2023.

Spin-offs

My Hero Academia: Smash!!

Volume list

My Hero Academia: Vigilantes

Volume list

My Hero Academia: Team-Up Missions

Volume list

References

My Hero Academia
My Hero Academia